County Bridge No. 36 is a historic concrete arch bridge spanning Jacoby Creek in Portland, Pennsylvania. It was built in 1907, and is a small, single arched bridge with a span measuring 28 feet.  It features an incised keystone and a simply ornamented, continuous concrete parapet.

It was added to the National Register of Historic Places in 1988.

References

1907 establishments in Pennsylvania
Arch bridges in the United States
Bridges completed in 1907
Bridges in Northampton County, Pennsylvania
Concrete bridges in the United States
National Register of Historic Places in Northampton County, Pennsylvania
Road bridges on the National Register of Historic Places in Pennsylvania